Young Erne (1884-1944) was an American boxer from Philadelphia, Pennsylvania. In his first 36 fights, he had a record of 28-2-6.

Career
Despite never having fought for a world title, he held wins over champions and International Boxing Hall of Fameers such as Harry Lewis, Young Corbett II, Abe Attell, George Lavigne, Jack Britton. While Erne is not enshrined into the International Boxing Hall of Fame, he was inducted into the Philadelphia Boxing Hall of Fame.

Professional boxing record
All information in this section is derived from BoxRec, unless otherwise stated.

Official record

All newspaper decisions are officially regarded as "no decision" bouts and are not counted in the win/loss/draw column.

Unofficial record

Record with the inclusion of newspaper decisions in the win/loss/draw column.

References

External links
 missing title
 Young Erne - BoxRec

1884 births
1944 deaths
Boxers from Pennsylvania
American male boxers
Lightweight boxers